Gujarati numerals is the numeral system of the Gujarati script of South Asia, which is a derivative of Devanagari numerals. It is the official numeral system of Gujarat, India. It is also officially recognized in India and as a minor script in Pakistan.

Digits 
The following table shows Gujarati digits and the Gujarati word for each of them in various scripts.

Larger numbers 
Digits are combined to represent numbers larger than 9 as per the standard positional decimal rules.

See also
Gujarati script
Gurmukhi numerals
Devanagari alphabet

References

Numerals
Gujarati culture

External links 
1 to 100 Gujarati Numbers and Words from English